Barbata is a comune (municipality) in the Province of Bergamo in the Italian region of Lombardy, located about  east of Milan and about  southeast of Bergamo.

Barbata borders the following municipalities: Antegnate, Camisano, Casaletto di Sopra, Covo, Fontanella, Isso.

References